The 2017–18 Northeast Conference men's basketball season began with practices in October 2017, followed by the start of the 2017–18 NCAA Division I men's basketball season in November. Conference play started in late December and concluded in February 2018.

The NEC tournament will be held from March 1 through March 7 with the higher-seeded team hosting each game.

Head coaches

Coaching changes 
On April 18, 2017, LIU Brooklyn announced Derek Kellogg as the 14th head coach in program history. Kellogg replaced Jack Perri, whose contract was not renewed; Perri became an assistant at Boston University.

Coaches 

Notes: 
 All records, appearances, titles, etc. are from time with current school only. 
 Year at school includes 2017–18 season.
 Overall and NEC/NCAA records are from time at current school and are before the beginning of the 2017–18 season.
 Previous jobs are head coaching jobs unless otherwise noted.

Preseason

Preseason coaches poll
Source

() first place votes

Preseason All-NEC team
Source

NEC regular season

Conference matrix
This table summarizes the head-to-head results between teams in conference play. (x) indicates games remaining this season.

Player of the week
Throughout the regular season, the Northeast Conference offices named player(s) of the week and rookie(s) of the week.

Source

Postseason

NEC tournament

  March, 2018 Northeast Conference Basketball Tournament.

All games will be played at the venue of the higher seed

NCAA tournament

National Invitational Tournament

CollegeInsider.com Postseason Tournament

All-NEC honors and awards
Following the regular season, the conference selected outstanding performers based on a poll of league coaches.

References

External links
NEC website